The 1985–86 season was Clydebank's twentieth season in the Scottish Football League. They competed in the Scottish Premier Division for the second time in their history and finished at the foot of the table but spared relegation due to league reconstruction when the Premier League expanded to 12 teams from the following season. They also competed in the Scottish League Cup and Scottish Cup.

Results

Premier Division

Final League table

Scottish League Cup

Scottish Cup

References

 

Clydebank
Clydebank F.C. (1965) seasons